Gonadal torsion refers to torsion of the gonads. It may refer to:

 Testicular torsion
 Ovarian torsion